The Signal is the debut solo album by German singer Sandra Nasić, lead vocalist of the alternative rock band Guano Apes. Released in 2007, it peaked at No. 46 on the German charts. The songs on the album are mainly alternative rock, though they also contain pop and electronic elements.

Track listing

Personnel
 Sandra Nasić - vocals, guitars, bass, keyboards
 Christian Neander, Godi Hildmann, Patrik Berger, and Steve Lironi - guitars
 Martin Helms, Klaus Knapp, Steve Lironi, Patrik Berger, and Christian Neander - bass
 Patrik Berger and Oliver Pinelli - keyboards
 Nico Lipolis, Ged Lynch, Sebastian Forslund, and Reiner Hubert - drums

References

External links
 

2007 debut albums
Alternative rock albums by German artists